Berk Oktay (born October 28, 1982) is a Turkish model and actor, known for his 
leading roles in series İlişki Durumu: Karışık, Benim Hala Umudum Var alongside actress Gizem Karaca and actor Şükrü Özyıldız. He appeared in other hit series such as Yasak Elma, Savaşçı, Arka Sokaklar, and Akasya Durağı. He begun his acting career in Tatlı Bela Fadime alongside Nehir Erdoğan.

He had faced allegations of violence from his former wife, Merve. Their divorce was finalized in 2020. In 2022, He married Yıldız Çağrı Atiksoy who was his co-star in the military series "Savaşçı".

Filmography

Television

Awards

References

External links 

1982 births
Living people
Turkish male models
Turkish male television actors
Male actors from Ankara